Frederick Neville Pringle (22 December 1899 – 12 November 1982) was an Australian rules footballer who played for Cananore in the Tasmanian Football League (TFL) and Carlton in the Victorian Football League (VFL) during the 1920s.

Family
The son of Charles Lowes Pringle (1868-1932), and May Gertrude Pringle, née Hewitt, Frederick Neville Pringle was born in Assam, India on 22 December 1899.

He married Berenice Margaret Berkery (1906-1945) in 1929.

Pre-war football
Pringle was brought up in Tasmania where he played football with Cananore. Just 15 years of age when he debuted in 1915, he had to wait until 1920 to play again, due to the suspension of the competition during the war.

Military service
He served as a gunner in the 10th Field Artillery Brigade of the First AIF during World War I.

Post-war football
A ruckman who was at times used as a key position player, he had a two-season stint at Carlton, beginning in 1923, which impressed the state selectors enough to see him represent the VFL.

When Pringle resumed playing at Cananore in 1925 it was as captain-coach and he promptly steered them to three successive premierships. To highlight the strength of this Cananore side, they played a challenge match in 1925 against South Australian Football League club Port Adelaide and won by 178 points. He played his last TFL season in 1928 and then retired, having represented Tasmania in six interstate matches, most recent of which was the 1927 Melbourne Carnival.

Death
He died at Sandy Bay, Tasmania on 12 November 1982.

Tasmanian Football Hall of Fame
In 2005 he was honoured as one of the inaugural inductees into the Tasmanian Football Hall of Fame.

See also
 1924 Hobart Carnival
 1927 Melbourne Carnival

Footnotes

References
 Holmesby, Russell and Main, Jim (2007). The Encyclopedia of AFL Footballers. 7th ed. Melbourne: Bas Publishing.
 Farewell to Fred. Pringle, The Mercury, (Monday, 26 February 1923), p.11.
 First World War Nominal Roll: Gunner Frederick Neville Pringle (39117), collection of the Australian War Memorial.
 First World War Embarkation Roll: Gunner Frederick Neville Pringle (39117), collection of the Australian War Memorial.
 First World War Service Record: Gunner Frederick Neville Pringle (39117), National Archives of Australia.

External links
 
 
 Blueseum: Fred Pringle

1899 births
1982 deaths
VFL/AFL players born outside Australia
Australian rules footballers from Tasmania
Carlton Football Club players
Cananore Football Club players
Australian people of Anglo-Indian descent
Australian sportspeople of Indian descent
Indian emigrants to Australia
Tasmanian Football Hall of Fame inductees